The Ninth East Asia Summit was held in Nay Pyi Taw, Myanmar (Burma) on November 12–13, 2014. The East Asia Summit is an annual meeting of national leaders from the East Asian region and adjoining countries.

Attending delegations
The heads of state and heads of government of the eighteen countries were participated in the summit.

Agenda

All the countries supported the East Asia summit declaration on Islamic State (terror group). And also asserted that an international partnership is required for a comprehensive response against terrorism. The summit also rejected any linkage between religion and terrorism. They have also said that it should be ensured that cyberspace and space remain a source of connectivity and prosperity and not new threats of conflicts.

References

2014 conferences
2014 in international relations
21st-century diplomatic conferences (Asia-Pacific)
ASEAN meetings
2014 in Myanmar
21st century in Naypyidaw
November 2014 events in Asia